Diwan on the Prince of Emgion is a 1965 book of poetry by the Swedish writer Gunnar Ekelöf. It received the Nordic Council Literature Prize. In the prize motivation, the jury called the work "a cycle of poems, which in the guise of interpretations of Byzantine songs and myths, finds new and personal symbols for the experiences of the divine and of suffering and love as the basic human condition." It became the first installment in a trilogy, which continued with The Tale of Fatumeh and Guide to the Underworld.

See also
 1965 in literature
 Swedish literature

References

1965 poetry books
Swedish poetry collections
Albert Bonniers Förlag books
Nordic Council's Literature Prize-winning works